The Clackmannanshire Council election of 2022 was held on Thursday 5 May 2022, on the same day as the 31 other local authorities in Scotland. It was the fourth election to run under the STV electoral system with 18 councillors being elected across five wards.

Background

2017 result

Note: "Votes" are the first preference votes. The net gain/loss and percentage changes relate to the result of the previous Scottish local elections on 3 May 2007. This may differ from other published sources showing gain/loss relative to seats held at dissolution of Scotland's councils.

Result

The Scottish National Party won 9 of the 18 seats on the council an increase of one on the total they had won at the previous contest in 2017. Scottish Labour held their five seats, but the Scottish Conservatives lost two seats and finished with three Councillors. The Scottish Greens won the remaining seat, the first time they had won a seat in Clackmannanshire.

Note: "Votes" are the first preference votes. The net gain/loss and percentage changes relate to the result of the previous Scottish local elections on 3 May 2007. This may differ from other published sources showing gain/loss relative to seats held at dissolution of Scotland's councils.

Ward summary

|- class="unsortable" align="centre"
!rowspan=2 align="left"|Ward
!% 
!Seats
!%
!Seats
!%
!Seats
!%
!Seats
!%
!Seats
!%
!Seats
!rowspan=2|TotalCllrs
|- class="unsortable" align="center"
!colspan=2 bgcolor="" |SNP
!colspan=2 bgcolor="" |Lab
!colspan=2 bgcolor=""|Conservative
!colspan=2 bgcolor="" |Green
!colspan=2 bgcolor="" |Lib Dem
!colspan=2 bgcolor="white"|Others
|-
|align="left"|Clackmannanshire West
|bgcolor="" | 43.65
|bgcolor="" | 2
|26.82
|1
|22.78
|1
|4.04
|0
|2.72
|0
|colspan="2" 
|4
|-
|align="left"|Clackmannanshire North
|bgcolor="" |41.39
|bgcolor="" |2
|18.72
|1
|21.95
|1
|5.73
|0
|3.18
|0
|9.04
|0
|4
|-
|align="left"|Clackmannanshire Central
|bgcolor="" |43.46
|bgcolor="" |2
|34.68
|1
|17.32
|0
|4.54
|0
|colspan="4" 
|3
|-
|align="left"|Clackmannanshire South
|bgcolor="" |37.94
|bgcolor="" |2
|23.06
|1
|16.54
|0
|19.51
|1
|colspan="2" 
|2.95
|0
|4
|-
|align="left"|Clackmannanshire East
|30.80
|1
|19.61
|1
|bgcolor="" |37.32
|bgcolor="" |1
|6.30
|0
|3.71
|0
|2.26
|0
|3
|- class="unsortable" class="sortbottom"
!align="left"|Total
!39.35
!9
!23.80
!5
!23.24
!3
!8.36
!1
!2.04
!0
!3.21
!0
!18
|}

Ward results

Clackmannanshire West
2017-2022 Change: No Change

Clackmannanshire North
2017-2022 Change: No Change

Clackmannanshire Central
2017-2022 Change: 1 x SNP gain from Conservative

Clackmannanshire South
2017-2022 Change: 1 x Green gain from Conservative

Clackmannanshire East
2017-2022 Change: No Change

References

2022
Clackmannanshire
Council election, 2022